Evalljapyx boneti is a species of forcepstail in the family Japygidae. It is found in Central America.

References

Diplura
Articles created by Qbugbot
Animals described in 1948